District 11 is an electoral district in Malta. It was established in 1976. Its boundaries have changed many times but it currently consists of the localities of Attard, Mdina, Mosta and the hamlet of Burmarrad.

Representatives

2017 General Election

References 

Districts of Malta